The Oman national football team represents Oman in men's international football and is controlled by the Oman Football Association. Although the team was officially founded in 1978, the squad was formed some time before that and a proper football association was formed only in December 2005.

History
The mid 1990s under the OFA chairmanship of Sheikh Saif bin Hashil Al-Maskary saw Oman achieve higher results on the Asian stage. Former Omani captain, Hani Al-Dhabit was awarded the RSSSF 2001 World Top Scorer, with 22 goals; the most goals scored by a player who won the World Top Scorer award till date and also being the third Arab and only the first Omani to win the award.

The senior team has never qualified for the World Cup but has qualified for the Asian Cup in the years 2004, 2007, 2015 and 2019. They also have reached the Arabian Gulf Cup final four times and have won it for the first time on their third attempt as hosts in 2009. They had to wait for the 2017 edition to win the tournament for the second time in their history.

Gulf Cup performance
Prior to the newer millennium, Oman generally struggled more in the Gulf Cup, usually finishing in 6th or 7th place even when the cup was held in Oman. It was in 1998 when the national team began to improve its performance and in the 2003 and 2004 Gulf Cups, new talents like Amad Al-Hosni, Ali Al-Habsi, Sultan Al-Touqi, Badr Al-Maimani and Khalifa Ayil may have made the team more successful.

In the 2002 Gulf Cup which was held in Saudi Arabia, Oman had once again finished at 5th place but under the captaincy of Dhofar F.C.'s Hani Al-Dhabit, Oman had accomplished something which was never done before in the team's history in the Gulf Cup, defeating 9-time winners Kuwait. The match had ended 3–1 with captain Hani Al-Dhabit scoring a hat-trick. Hani also netted a goal against Bahrain and a consolation goal in a 2–1 loss against Qatar. At the end of the competition, Hani was the only Omani to score goals and was also awarded the "Top Goalscorer" of the competition with a total of 5 goals.

In the 2004 Gulf Cup which was held in Doha, Oman reached the final for the first time in the team's history which was eventually lost to the hosts Qatar in a penalty shootout after the goalkeeping sensation Ali Al-Habsi missed a penalty. Qatar won the match 6–5 on penalties after the match had ended 1–1 at normal time. Amad Al-Hosni was awarded the "Top Goalscorer" award of the competition with a total of 4 goals.

In the 2007 Gulf Cup which was held in the United Arab Emirates, the national team again reached the final for a second consecutive time and again lost 1–0 to the hosts United Arab Emirates. Although Oman lost to the Emirates in the final, they had maintained an undefeated record throughout the competition excluding the final. Once again Ali Al-Habsi had received the "Best Goalkeeper of the Gulf Cup" award for the third consecutive time in a row, the most won by any goalkeeper in the 40 years of the Gulf Cup tournament. Oman had tied United Arab Emirates in goal-scoring with nine goals each after the competition.

Eventually after losing twice in the Gulf Cup final consecutively, Oman had managed to win the 2009 Gulf Cup tournament as hosts by defeating Saudi Arabia in a penalty shootout. Oman won the match 6–5 on penalties after the match had ended 0–0 at extra time. Oman maintained a clean-sheet throughout the whole competition. The competition in Muscat was the first for Hassan Rabia, and despite this, he managed to score 4 goals making him receive the "Top Goalscorer" award. Ali Al-Habsi also received his fourth consecutive "Best Goalkeeper Award".

However, Ali Al-Habsi would not go on to feature in the next two Gulf Cup's due to his commitments with his English club team Wigan Athletic F.C. at the time. In the 2010 Gulf Cup which was held in Yemen, Oman drew all the three matches of the group stage against Bahrain, United Arab Emirates and Iraq. Oman could manage to score only one goal in the tournament against Bahrain which was scored by Amad Al-Hosni and hence could not go further in the tournament. Following these performances of the team in the regional tournament, the Oman Football Association sacked their then-manager Claude Le Roy on 9 January 2011 who won them their maiden tournament in 2009.

In the 2013 Gulf Cup which was held in Bahrain, Oman could manage to draw only one match against the hosts Bahrain and lost in their other two matches against Qatar and United Arab Emirates. Oman again could score only one goal and this time it was from the spot by Hussain Al-Hadhri in the match against Qatar which Oman eventually lost 2–1.

In the 2017 Gulf Cup which was held in Kuwait, Oman started the tournament with a loss to the United Arab Emirates by one goal from a penalty kick by Ali Mabkhout. Afterwards, Oman won the two remaining matches of the group stage, first against the hosts Kuwait 1–0 with a penalty kick by Ahmed Kano then against Saudi Arabia 2–0. Oman qualified to the semi-final match which was against Bahrain and won it 1–0 with an own goal by the Bahraini Mahdi Abduljabbar.
Eventually, and after nine years from its first title, Oman managed to win the tournament for the second time in its history by defeating United Arab Emirates in the final in a penalty shootout. Oman won the match 5–4 on penalties after it had ended 0–0 after extra time. The Omani Ahmed Mubarak Kano was awarded the most valuable player award for his role in the results of the Omani team campaign.

Kits and sponsors

Over the years Oman has had multiple kit providers of which Grand Sport held the contract for the longest period. Oman has also worn kits provided by Puma, Umbro, Lotto and Adidas.

The national team signed a contract in 2006 with Gulf Air but the deal ended in 2008 and was replaced with a signed sponsorship by Omantel's Oman Mobile.

On 9 May 2012, the Oman Football Association launched the new official team kit to be worn by Oman in their push for 2014 FIFA World Cup qualification – AFC Fourth Round. The new kit was launched together with a new OFA logo. The new kit was designed for Oman by Taj Oman, an Oman-based company. Later in June 2012, Oman's  airline Oman Air became the official carrier of the Oman Football Association.

On 8 February 2014, the Omani Football Association confirmed the tie-up with Italian sports apparel manufacturer Kappa. A joint venture agreement was signed by sportswear Kappa and the OFA's apparel brand Taj Oman. In a 4-year deal, Kappa will produce the kit worn by all the Oman National football teams bearing the Taj mark and will provide Oman with a range of sportswear specific for the country. The deal will see both the names (Kappa & Taj) on the kit worn by the National teams and on all retail items. Oman Air also renewed its deal on the same day with the OFA till the end of the 2013–14 season. On 16 September 2014, the Omani Football Association announced that they had signed an agreement with Asia Sports Marketing to become the exclusive sales agent for the Association.

On 9 September 2015, the Omani Football Association signed a one-year contract extension with Oman Air as the official carrier of the national team. The association said that although Oman Air's ticket allocation in the deal is primarily meant for the senior national team's tours, OFA has availed the privilege for club teams' trips to Salalah for Omantel Professional League (OPL) matches and also for overseas travel of the national age-group squads. On 18 October 2015, the Omani Football Association announced a partnership with a new mental energizer Energy Drinks Partner, Effect.

In 2018, the OFA signed a contract with German sports company Jako.

Recent and forthcoming matches

The following is a list of match results in the next 12 months:

2022

2023

Coaching staff

Coaching history
Caretaker managers are listed in italics.

 Mohammed Al-Khafaji (1974–1976)
 George Smith (1979)
 Hamed El-Dhiab (1980–1982)
 Mansaf El-Meliti (1982)
 Paulo de Oliveira (1984)
 Antônio Clemente (1986)
 Jorge Vitório (1986–1988)
 Karl-Heinz Heddergott (1988–1989)
 Bernd Patzke (1990–1992)
 Heshmat Mohajerani (1992–1994)
 Rashid Jaber (1995–1996)
 Mahmoud El-Gohary (1996)
 Jozef Vengloš (1996–1997)
 Ian Porterfield (1997)
 Homayoun Shahrokhi (1997–1998)
 Valdeir Vieira (1998–1999)
 Carlos Alberto Torres (2000–2001)
 Milan Máčala (2001, 2003–2005, 2006–2007)
 Bernd Stange (2001)
 Rashid Jaber (2002)
 Srečko Juričić (2005–2006)
 Hamad Al-Azani (2006)
 Gabriel Calderón (2007–2008)
 Julio César Ribas (2008)
 Hamad Al-Azani (2008)
 Claude Le Roy (2008–2010)
 Hamad Al-Azani (2010–2011)
 Paul Le Guen (2011–2015)
 Juan Ramón López Caro (2016)
 Pim Verbeek (2016–2019)
 Erwin Koeman (2019)
 Goran Stevanović  (2020)
 Branko Ivanković (2020–present)

Players

Current squad
 The following players were called up for the 25th Arabian Gulf Cup matches.
 Match dates: 6 – 19 January 2023
 Opposition: ,  and 
 Caps and goals correct as of:' 23 December 2022, after the match against 

Recent call-ups
The following players have also been called up to the squad within the last 12 months.

RecordsPlayers in bold are still active with Oman.Most appearances

Top goalscorers

Competition records

FIFA World Cup

AFC Asian Cup

Gulf Cup

WAFF Championship

Asian Games

Pan Arab Games

Arab Cup

Head-to-head recordUpdated on 12 April 2022 after match against .''

See also
 Oman national under-23 football team
 Oman women's national football team

References

External links

Official Oman Football Association Website
Oman national football team FIFA.com
Oman national football team – Football-Lineups
Oman national football team – NATIONAL FOOTBALL TEAMS

 
Asian national association football teams